Kane Hamidou Baba (10 April 1954 – 28 December 2021) was a Mauritanian politician. A member of the Union of Democratic Forces, he served in the National Assembly from 2006 to 2013. He died in a traffic collision in Las Palmas, Spain, on 28 December 2021, at the age of 67.

References

1954 births
2021 deaths
Mauritanian politicians
Members of the National Assembly (Mauritania)
Union of Democratic Forces (Mauritania) politicians
People from Trarza Region